Caulfield Football Club was an Australian rules football club which played in the VFA from 1965 until 1987 when due to financial difficulties the club folded.

History

Origins
The Camden Town Football Club was based in the South Caulfield area and had been in existence from at least 1898.
In 1910 they entered a side in the Federal Football Association Junior competition. They won the premiership in 1911. Play was suspended for the World War I.

After the war the club resumed and changed its name to South Caulfield and joined the VJFA. In 1922 the club won lower grade premiership. In 1926 until 1940 the club competed in the MAFA. While the senior team was in the Amateurs, in 1939 a junior side was formed and entered the Federal Football League B grade competition using its original name of Camden. In 1941 Camden continued to field a team in the wartime competition. Once peace was declared, the wartime competition became open aged again.
Camden were runners-up in 1945 and 1948. Both times they lost to Moorabbin. It is important to note that Camden had the lease to Princes Park, Caulfield. After their near success in the 1940s the club slowly began to slip down the ladder. A play off for the 1952 Grand Final was their last hoohaa. The club quickly dropped down the ladder to finish last in 1954 and near last in 1955 and 1956.

In 1957 Camden and the South Caulfield CYMS Football Club merged to established as the "South Caulfield Football Club" in 1957 and played at Princes Park. Their time was not successful in the Federal District League spending most of its time near the bottom of the ladder.

VFA
On 29 March 1962, the South Caulfield Football Club from the Federal District League merged with the Victorian Football Association's struggling Brighton Football Club which could barely field a team and had been evicted from its home ground at Elsternwick Park to form a club known as "Brighton-Caulfield". The merged club was based at South Caulfield's home ground at Princes Park on Hawthorn Rd, Caulfield. Caulfield City Council wanted a VFA club in its municipality but not without the municipality name.

In 1965, after three seasons of competing as Brighton-Caulfield, the club with pressure from the Caulfield council, severed all links to its former Brighton identity, and became known as the Caulfield Football Club. The club adopted a new guernsey of white with navy blue hoops, and adopted Bears as a new nickname.

Caulfield initially played in the second division and failed to make the finals during the rest of the 1960s. In 1971 they managed to lure former Richmond premiership player Tony Jewell to coach the club. They also recruited his teammates Paddy Guinane and Neville Crowe to the playing group. With VFL players in the team they had immediate success, topping the second division ladder and losing just three games in the home and away season. Caulfield however lost their preliminary final and thus missed out on playing in the grand final. They went one better the following season and made it to the decider which they lost to Geelong West in the last minute; the Geelong club had been unbeaten all season, but Caulfield put up a fight, leading by 12 points at three-quarter time.

In 1973, the club won its first and only premiership, defeating Brunswick 18.20 (128) to 14.22 (106) in the grand final; full forward John Logan kicked six goals. This victory earned the promotion to the first division, where it competed for eight years. In its time in the top division, the club reached the finals once, in 1976; and, in 1977 it won the lightning premiership and was runner-up in the Centenary Cup.

At the end of 1981, Caulfield was demoted to Division 2 as part of a restructure of the Association's two-division system, in large part because of its substandard playing facilities. In its first season back in Division 2, the club reached the grand final, losing to Northcote by five points. The club endured financial difficulties through the 1980s, and it was eventually suspended from the Association after the 1987 season, due to having falling $11,000 behind on affiliation levies.

In 1988 the club merged with local club Ashburton to form Caulfield-Ashburton Football Club, and won the premiership in the South East Suburban FL first division; but, the club was suspended shortly before the 1989 season after it sent an abusive letter to the league secretary, and folded permanently.

Premierships 
 Victorian Football Association
 Second Division (1): 1973

Notable players
 Neville Crowe (Richmond)
 Paddy Guinane (Richmond)
 Tony Jewell (Richmond)
 Darren Kappler (Fitzroy/Hawthorn/Sydney)

References

External links
 Caulfield Bears on Sporting Pulse website

Former Victorian Football League clubs
Australian rules football clubs in Melbourne
1965 establishments in Australia
Australian rules football clubs established in 1965
1988 disestablishments in Australia
Australian rules football clubs disestablished in 1988